Beighton  is a village and civil parish in the Broadland district of Norfolk, England, about two miles (3 km) South-West of Acle about 12.8 miles (20.6 km) to Norwich. It covers an area of 7.63 km2 (2.95 sq mil) and has a population of 436 in 185 households according to the 2011 census. Today, Beighton incorporates the old parish of Moulton St Mary, and both parishes are mentioned in the Domesday Book of 1086. The All Saints church is situated within Beighton, along Church Hill. The church was described in 1870 as:

The church is decorated English, and was recently restored.

History 

The name of the town was first recorded as Begetuna in 1086. The meaning of the world comes from the  Old English language meaning 'farmstead of a woman called Beage or of a man called Baega.'

Demographics

Population 
Overall, the population of Beighton has increased. From 1850 till 1910 there was a rapid decline in population due to the industrial revolution which attracted the rich families whom were previously living in large estates in Beighton countryside, into the busy city centres such as London to profit from the industrial boom. From 1910 to around 1920 population started to grow, however it then dropped due to the First World War where a large number of men whom where of fighting age joined their local regiments. From 1960 till 2010 the population has steadily grown, to the current population of 436. The ethnic make up of the area is predominantly white; 96.3% of the population in this area are White (English, Welsh, Scottish or Northern Irish) alongside various minority races. 25% of the population in the Parish are 25-44 and 29% of the population is between the age of 45–64 years old.

Occupation 
From the population of Beighton, 84 people have no qualifications. According to the 2011 census 101 people have a qualification of a degree and 172 have qualifications below degree level. Between males and females in 1881 there was a large contrast between the occupation field. Males tended to do the more manual jobs such as agriculture and construction whilst females tended to either be house wives or work in the domestic field.
According to the 2011 census, the occupation structure has dramatically changed. Majority of the working women in Beighton are employed in the Education, Health and Social work in 2011 rather than being in the domestic sector or with no known work in 1881. The men of the village have moved from agricultural work in to construction and manufacturing. This shift for both males and females has come from an improvement in education and the change in industry due to the industrial revolution. There is dramatic change in that from 1881 to 2011 women started working and thus got educated and become qualified to have occupations which were once male dominated.

In Beighton 20% of the population between the age of 16-74 are socio-economically classified as "Lower managerial and professional occupations" Examples of "Lower managerial and professional occupations" are social workers, nurses, journalists, retail managers and teachers.

Church of All Saints 
The earliest work is from the 13th century but the rest of the church seems to be of 14th century date. All Saints is a small to medium-sized church built of flint and stone dressing.  The church went under restoration in the 19th century with rebuilding of the north aisle and the upper stage of the west tower. Restoration also included the addition of a number of stained glass windows which added beauty and interest to the building.  All Saints is now a grade I listed building.

Barn at Hall's farm 
A 17th century building with six bays made from red brick on a timber frame with flint and brick gables. There are two cart entrances and a thatched roof. As of 1952 the building has become grade II listed.

Cedar House 
Cedar House is grade II listed building and is the largest building in the village of Beighton. Cedar House is a former rectory house built in the mid 19th century from red bricks and slated roof. Cedar House is now a residential home which was last sold in 1998 for £405,000.

Church of St Mary 
A grade I listed church  built in the 13th century with extra additions which have been added in the 14th century. The church was originally the parish church for Moulton. The church consists of nave, chancel, south porch and round tower. Red brick from the 16th century show that the church was further rebuilt in that century.

Manor House 
A grade II listed country house  built by local builder's as their version of a small but grand brick house in the early 18th century. The building is two storeys high with an attic and cellar. Although the house had been modified in the 19th century and 20th century, it still remains largely unchanged and in its original form. The grounds around the house have stables.

Notable people
Edward Fellowes (1845–1896), cricketer

War Memorial
Beighton War Memorial is located just outside All Saints' Churchyard and is a stone Celtic cross. It lists the following names for the First World War:
 Lance-Corporal Samuel Ebbage (1895-1917), 2nd Battalion, Essex Regiment
 Private Lewis E. Myhill (1888-1916), 102nd Battalion, Calgary Rifles, Canadian Army
 Private Frederick Brown (1893-1916), 8th Battalion, Royal Fusiliers
 Private William Myhill (1897-1917), 4th Battalion, Lincolnshire Regiment
 Private William D. Rose (1889-1918), 2nd Battalion, Loyal Regiment (North Lancashire)
 Deckhand Frederick G. Hubbard (1896-1918), HM Drifter Vintage
 William Godfrey, Royal Army Ordnance Corps
 Hubert H. Spooner (1881-1917), HMS Attentive II

And, the following for the Second World War:
 Leading-Stoker William B. Cator (1916-1942), HMS Blean (L47)

References

External links

Villages in Norfolk
Civil parishes in Norfolk
Broadland